Kristel Macrohon (born 2 September 1996) is a Filipino weightlifter. She won the gold medal in the women's 71kg event at the 2019 Southeast Asian Games held in Manila, Philippines.

At the 2017 Asian Indoor and Martial Arts Games held in Ashgabat, Turkmenistan, she won the bronze medal in the women's 69kg event. In 2018, she represented the Philippines at the Asian Games held in Jakarta, Indonesia in the women's 69 kg event where she finished in last place. In that same year, she competed in the women's 71 kg event at the 2018 World Weightlifting Championships held in Ashgabat, Turkmenistan. In 2020, she won the bronze medal in the women's 71kg event at the Roma 2020 World Cup in Rome, Italy.

She competed in the women's 71 kg event at the 2021 World Weightlifting Championships held in Tashkent, Uzbekistan.

References

External links 
 

Living people
1996 births
Place of birth missing (living people)
Filipino female weightlifters
Weightlifters at the 2018 Asian Games
Asian Games competitors for the Philippines
Southeast Asian Games gold medalists for the Philippines
Southeast Asian Games medalists in weightlifting
Competitors at the 2019 Southeast Asian Games
Competitors at the 2021 Southeast Asian Games
21st-century Filipino women